Don Íñigo López de Mendoza y Zúñiga (1489 – 9 June 1535), cardinal, archbishop of Burgos and bishop of Coria, was a Castilian clergyman and diplomat in the service of Emperor Charles V.

Biography
Don Íñigo was born in Aranda de Duero, the second son of Don Pedro de Zúñiga, 2nd Count of Miranda del Castañar, and Catalina de Velasco, daughter of Pedro Fernández de Velasco, 2nd Count of Haro. Although a Zúñiga, he was named Mendoza after his maternal grandmother Mencia de Mendoza.

In 1526 he went as ambassador for Charles V to England. On his way there, he was arrested for 4 months by the French. In 1528 he was imprisoned by the English because of deteriorating relations between Charles and Henry VIII.  He was only rarely allowed to send letters. After this, he asked for his recall, both because of bad health, and because the English didn't trust him. He was allowed to quit England in May 1529 and was succeeded in his post by Eustace Chapuys.

After that he went to Italy, where he witnessed Charles' coronation as Holy Roman Emperor at Bologna in 1530. That same year he was also made a cardinal.

De Mendoza is portrayed by Declan Conlon in Showtime's series The Tudors. On the show it is not mentioned that he was a Clergyman.

References

José Pablo Alzina, Embajadores de España en Londres. Una guía de retratos de la embajada de España (Ministerio de Asuntos Exteriores, Madrid 2001)

1476 births
1535 deaths
People from Miranda de Ebro
Ambassadors of Spain to England
16th-century Spanish cardinals
Archbishops of Burgos
16th-century Roman Catholic archbishops in Spain
16th-century diplomats
University of Salamanca alumni
Ambassadors of the Holy Roman Empire
16th-century people of the Holy Roman Empire